El Salón México is a symphonic composition in one movement by Aaron Copland, which uses Mexican folk music extensively.  Copland began the work in 1932 and completed it in 1936, following several visits to Mexico. The four melodies of the piece are based on sheet music he purchased during his visits.

The dance hall

The work is a musical depiction of a dance hall in Mexico City called "El Salón México", which, as its name implies, represents the country of Mexico, with multiple types of music played. The subtitle was "A Popular Type Dance Hall in Mexico City."

Copland observed that he despaired of the ability to portray, or even understand, the complexity that is Mexico. He continues to say that what he wrote, and what he knew he was writing, was a portrayal of the "visible" Mexico, to some extent the touristy Mexico. He chose dance as the vehicle for his musical portrayal.

Although Copland wrote in his autobiography that he had been taken to "El Salón México" by Carlos Chávez, he also learned of it from a guidebook:
Perhaps my piece might never have been written if it hadn't been for the existence of the Salón México. I remember reading about it for the first time in a tourist guide book: "Harlem-type nightclub for the peepul [ sic in the original ], grand Cuban orchestra. Three halls: one for people dressed in your way, one for people dressed in overalls but shod, and one for the barefoot." When I got there, I also found a sign on the wall which said: "Please don't throw lighted cigarette butts on the floor so the ladies don't burn their feet."

…In some inexplicable way, while milling about in those crowded halls, one really felt a live contact with the Mexican people — the atomic sense one sometimes gets in far-off places, of suddenly knowing the essence of a people — their humanity, their separate shyness, their dignity and unique charm. 

El Salón México, at Pensador Mexicano 16, opened in 1920 and was the dance capital of Mexico City. For dance bands it was the leading venue in the capital and country, where a wide variety of tunes were played: waltz, foxtrot, tango, pasodoble, and the Cuban danzón; Cuban orchestras often played there, and one Cuban orchestra that appeared regularly wrote a danzón called "Salón México". It was a place to dance and, it was said, smelled of sweat. There was one entrance, but three doors off of it, where patrons sorted themselves by what kind of music and dances they wanted. It was a rare venue where rich, middle class, and poor all attended, with a famous sign, in the lower-class or "proletariat" room, where barefoot dancing was frequent, saying "Don't throw cigarette butts on the floor because the ladies will burn their feet."

The hall had murals, now lost, by Diego Rivera, Salvador Novo, Dolores Olmedo, and others. It closed in 1960.

The music
The work contains three musical styles and goes through the series of three twice, starting each time with the upper-class music, passing through a more vigorous working-class music, and ending with the foot-stomping dance of the peasantry. Divisions between the sections are clear, as if one had walked through a doorway. The upper-class music suggests formal European dancing of the nineteenth century, unlyrical and even unmasculine. The peasant music is far richer rhythmically and more powerful, with a suggestion of the pre-Hispanic (Indian) in it. The work's conclusion celebrates this kind of music, not that of the well-to-do. Musically, the work displays beautifully Copland's populism.

History of the work
Copland began the work in 1932 and completed it in 1936. The Mexico Symphony Orchestra gave the first performance under the direction of Carlos Chávez on August 27th, 1937.  The piece was premiered in the U.S. on May 14, 1938 by Adrian Boult and the NBC Symphony Orchestra. Although Copland visited Mexico early in the 1930s, he based this tone poem not on songs he heard there, but rather on written sheet music for at least four Mexican folk songs that he had obtained: "El palo verde," "La Jesusita," "El mosco," and "El malacate." The powerful refrain that appears in the piece three times stems from "El palo verde." Critics have variously described the piece as containing two, three, or four parts, but many listeners find that it moves seamlessly from one theme to another with no clear internal boundaries.

At least three arrangements of the piece exist in addition to the orchestral score. Copland adapted the work for the 1947 musical film Fiesta, directed by Richard Thorpe for MGM. Leonard Bernstein created arrangements for solo piano and for two pianos, four-hands very shortly after the premiere.  In addition, a piano transcription of the score was made by conductor Arturo Toscanini in 1942, when the Maestro included the music on an NBC broadcast concert.

In 2009, filmmakers Paul Glickman and Tamarind King premiered their animated short film El Salón México based on the Copland score at The Film Museum Theater in Santa Fe, New Mexico.

Recordings
Leonard Bernstein (for Columbia Records and Deutsche Grammophon) and Copland himself (for Columbia Records) conducted recordings of the work.  Arturo Toscanini and the NBC Symphony Orchestra performed the music in a broadcast concert on March 14, 1942, which was preserved on transcription discs; according to biographer Mortimer Frank, Copland praised the performance in a radio interview.  Other conductors who made recordings of El Salon Mexico include Arthur Fiedler, Eugene Ormandy, and Eduardo Mata. Serge Koussevitsky, Boston Symphony Orch., was recorded Nov. 1939 RCA Victor Album M651, transferred to Pearl GEMM 9492. The 1938 U.S. premiere performance by Adrian Boult and the NBC Symphony Orchestra has been issued from transcription discs on Pristine PASC 626.

References

External links
Video - Aaron Copland - El Salón México - Suite (10:19).

Compositions by Aaron Copland
1936 compositions
Compositions using folk songs
Compositions for symphony orchestra